Yann Dall'Aglio is a French philosopher and author, of Italian origin. He was also a speaker at TEDxParis 2012.

Yann writes about love in the modern era and he defines love as the desire of being desired.

Works
 Une Rolex à 50 ans - A-t-on le droit de rater sa vie ? (2011)
 JTM - L’amour est-il has been ? (2012)
 Vies, sentences et doctrines des sages (2014)

References

Living people
21st-century French philosophers
Year of birth missing (living people)